The 2003–04 Pacific Tigers men's basketball team represented the University of the Pacific during the 2003–04 NCAA Division I men's basketball season. The Tigers were led by 16th-year head coach Bob Thomason and played their home games at the Alex G. Spanos Center in Stockton, California as members of the Big West Conference. Pacific finished tied with Utah State atop the Big West regular season standings and followed by winning the Big West tournament to receive an automatic bid to the NCAA tournament. Playing as the No. 12 seed in the St. Louis region, the team upset No. 5 seed Providence in the opening round. Playing in the Round of 32 for the first time in school history, the Tigers were beaten by No. 4 seed Kansas to end their season at 25–8 (17–1 Big West).

Roster

Schedule and results

|-
!colspan=9 style=| Regular season

|-
!colspan=9 style=| Big West tournament

|-
!colspan=9 style=| NCAA tournament

Source:

References

Pacific Tigers men's basketball seasons
Pacific
Pacific
Pacific
Pacific